Elliott T. Bowers Stadium is a 12,593-seat multi-purpose stadium in Huntsville, Texas. The stadium has been home to the Sam Houston State University Bearkats football since 1986. Previously, the team played their homes games at Pritchett Field, which currently plays host to the University's women soccer team. The Bearkats are members of the Western Athletic Conference (WAC). Bowers Stadium is also home to the Huntsville Hornets, the local high school team.

History
Bowers stadium was named in honor of Dr. Elliott T. Bowers, a former president of Sam Houston State University. The stadium is located on campus at Sam Houston State University. The address for Bowers Stadium is 620 Bowers Blvd, Huntsville, Texas.

Renovations
In 2012, brand-new orange chairbacks were installed, replacing the older chairbacks previously in their place along with new parking lot locker rooms. 

In April 2013, The stadium added a video replay system scoreboard, an elevator leading up to the press box, and guest suites in the place of the old coach's press box section. New video graphics were designed and put in place for the video scoreboard as well.

In October 2021, the Ron Mafridge field house is expected to be completed. The field house is expected to feature a new interior and exterior worth $11,667,000 in renovations. The planning for the renovation took just over 15 years and will have an area of 27,000 square feet.

Features
The stadium includes several suites.  In addition to the Presidential suite seating 50 people, there are five other suites in the press box third level.  Two of the five can seat up to eight while the remaining three can seat up to six.  Additionally, the Bearkat Lounge in the Ron Mafridge Fieldhouse can hold up to 100 and the adjacent deck can hold another 75-100 individuals.

Home Record
The Bearkats are 148–48–1 (.754) since opening Bowers Stadium, and ranks as one of the toughest venues in the Western Athletic Conference. The Bearkats are also undefeated at home during the Division 1 FCS playoffs and won the 2020 Division 1 FCS national championship played in spring of 2021.

See also
 List of NCAA Division I FCS football stadiums

References

External links
 Bowers Stadium at buildingshsu

Sam Houston Bearkats football
College football venues
Sports venues in Texas
American football venues in Texas
Multi-purpose stadiums in the United States
Sam Houston State University
1986 establishments in Texas
Sports venues completed in 1986